General Electric has a long history, involving numerous mergers, acquisitions, and divestitures.

1876-1950

GE timeline

1950-2000

2000 and beyond

References

General Electric